Banjsko Brdo (Serbian Cyrillic: Бањско брдо) is a mountain in southwestern Serbia, above the town of Priboj. Its highest peak has an elevation of 1,282 meters above sea level.

References

Mountains of Serbia